María Cristina Schweizer (20 August 1940 – 1994) was an Argentine alpine skier. She competed at the 1960 Winter Olympics and the 1964 Winter Olympics.

References

1940 births
1994 deaths
Argentine female alpine skiers
Olympic alpine skiers of Argentina
Alpine skiers at the 1960 Winter Olympics
Alpine skiers at the 1964 Winter Olympics
Skiers from Buenos Aires